The women's 200m Sprint at the 1992 Summer Olympics (Cycling) was an event that consisted of cyclists making three laps around the track.  Only the time for the last 200 metres of the 750 metres covered was counted as official time. The races were held on Tuesday, July 28, Wednesday through  Friday, July 31, 1992 at the Velòdrom d'Horta.

Erika Salumäe defended her gold medal from 1988, but this time she represented her native Estonia instead of the Soviet Union that collapsed a year ago.

Medalists

Results
 Q denotes qualification by place in heat.
 q denotes qualification by overall place.
 REL denotes relegated- due to being passed
 WLK denotes a walkover-unopposed victory.
 DNS denotes did not start.
 DNF denotes did not finish.
 DQ denotes disqualification.
 NR denotes national record.
 OR denotes Olympic record.
 WR denotes world record.
 PB denotes personal best.
 SB denotes season best.

Qualifying round

Held Tuesday, July 28. 
Times and average speeds are listed.  Times are used for seeding.

1st round
Held Tuesday, July 28 
The first round consisted of four heats, of three riders.  Winners advanced to the next round, losers competed in the repechage.

Repechage 
Held Tuesday, July 28 
The seven  defeated cyclists from the first round took part in the repechage.  They raced in four heats, one being unopposed.  The winner of each heat advance to quarter-final.

Quarter-finals
Held Wednesday, July 29. 
The eight riders that had advanced to the quarterfinals competed pairwise in four matches.  Each match consisted of two races, with a potential third race being used as a tie-breaker if each cyclist won one of the first two races.  Winners advanced to the semifinals, losers competed in a 5th to 8th place classification.

Classification 5–8 
Held Friday, July 31 
The 5–8 classification was a single race with all four riders that had lost in the quarterfinals taking place.  The winner of the race received 5th place, with the others taking the three following places in order.

Semifinals
Held Thursday, July 30. 
The four riders that had advanced to the semifinals competed pairwise in two matches.  Each match consisted of two races, with a potential third race being used as a tie-breaker if each cyclist won one of the first two races. Winners advanced to the finals, losers competed in the bronze medal match.

Medal Finals
Held Friday, July 31.

Bronze medal match
The bronze medal match was contested in a set of three races, with the winner of two races declared the winner.

Gold medal match
The gold medal match was contested in a set of three races, with the winner of two races declared the winner.

Final classification

References

External links
Official Olympic Report

W
Cycling at the Summer Olympics – Women's sprint
Track cycling at the 1992 Summer Olympics
Olymp
Cyc